is a passenger railway station  located in the city of Nishinomiya, Hyōgo Prefecture, Japan. It is operated by the West Japan Railway Company (JR West).Despite the station's name roughly translating to “Koshien Stadium Entrance”, it is located nowhere near the venue, and a bus is required to reach it. The name is derived from the neighborhood the station is in, which is also called Kōshienguchi despite being distant from the stadium.

Lines

Station layout
The station consists of two island platforms on an embankment, serving three tracks, connected by a station building at ground-level. The outer line side of the inbound line (Platform 4) is closed with stainless steel fences, but there is a space that can be removed at almost equal intervals, and it is prepared for temporary stops of group trains and outer line trains and in case of emergency. However, it has never been actually used.The station has a Midori no Madoguchi staffed ticket office.

Platforms

Adjacent stations

|-
!colspan=5|West Japan Railway Company (JR West)

History
Kōshienguchi Station opened on July 20, 1934.  With the privatization of the Japan National Railways (JNR) on April 1, 1987, the station came under the aegis of the West Japan Railway Company.

Station numbering was introduced to the station in March 2018 with Kōshienguchi being assigned station number JR-A51.

Passenger statistics
In fiscal 2019, the station was used by an average of 18,735 passengers daily

Surrounding area
Muko River
Mukogawa Women's University Kamikoshien Campus (Koshien Hall)
Koshienguchi Shopping Street
Koshien Junior College
Koshien Gakuin Junior and Senior High School
Koshien Gakuin Elementary School

See also
List of railway stations in Japan

References

External links 

 Kōshienguchi Station from JR-Odekake.net 

Railway stations in Hyōgo Prefecture
Railway stations in Japan opened in 1934
Tōkaidō Main Line
Nishinomiya